A mesa is an isolated, flat-topped elevation, ridge or hill, which is bounded from all sides by steep escarpments and stands distinctly above a surrounding plain. Mesas characteristically consist of flat-lying soft sedimentary rocks capped by a more resistant layer or layers of harder rock, e.g. shales overlain by sandstones. The resistant layer acts as a caprock that forms the flat summit of a mesa. The caprock can consist of either sedimentary rocks such as sandstone and limestone; dissected lava flows; or a deeply eroded duricrust. Unlike plateau, whose usage does not imply horizontal layers of bedrock, e.g. Tibetan Plateau, the term mesa applies exclusively to the landforms built of flat-lying strata. Instead, flat-topped plateaus are specifically known as tablelands.<ref name="DuszyńskiOthers2019a">Duszyński, F., Migoń, P. and Strzelecki, M.C., 2019. Escarpment retreat in sedimentary tablelands and cuesta landscapes–Landforms, mechanisms and patterns. Earth-Science Reviews, no. 102890. doi.org/10.1016/j.earscirev.2019.102890</ref>Neuendorf, Klaus K.E. Mehl, James P., Jr. Jackson, Julia A.. (2011). Glossary of Geology (5th Edition). American Geosciences Institute. 

Names, definition and etymology
As noted by Bryan in 1922, mesas "...stand distinctly above the surrounding country, as a table stands above the floor upon which it rests". It is from this appearance the term mesa was adopted from the Spanish word mesa meaning "table".

A mesa is similar to, but has a more extensive summit area than, a butte. However, there is no agreed size limit that separates mesas from either buttes or plateaus.

Less strictly, a very broad, flat-topped, usually isolated hill or mountain of moderate height bounded on at least one side by a steep cliff or slope and representing an erosion remnant also have been called mesas.

In the English language geomorphic and geologic literature, other terms for mesa have also been used. For example, in the Roraima region of Venezuela, the traditional name, tepui, from the local Pomón language, and the term table mountains have been used to describe local flat-topped mountains.Doerr, S.H., 1999. Karst-like landforms and hydrology in quartzites of the Venezuelan Guyana shield: Pseudokarst or" real" karst?. Zeitschrift fur Geomorphologie, 43(1), pp.1-17. Similar landforms in Australia are known as tablehills, table-top hills, tent hills, or jump ups (jump-ups). The German term Tafelberg''''' has also been used in the English scientific literature in the past.

Formation 

Mesas form by weathering and erosion of horizontally layered rocks that have been uplifted by tectonic activity. Variations in the ability of different types of rock to resist weathering and erosion cause the weaker types of rocks to be eroded away, leaving the more resistant types of rocks topographically higher than their surroundings. This process is called differential erosion. The most resistant rock types include sandstone, conglomerate, quartzite, basalt, chert, limestone, lava flows and sills. Lava flows and sills, in particular, are very resistant to weathering and erosion, and often form the flat top, or caprock, of a mesa. The less resistant rock layers are mainly made up of shale, a softer rock that weathers and erodes more easily.

The differences in strength of various rock layers are what give mesas their distinctive shape. Less resistant rocks are eroded away on the surface into valleys, where they collect water drainage from the surrounding area, while the more resistant layers are left standing out. A large area of very resistant rock, such as a sill, may shield the layers below it from erosion while the softer rock surrounding it is eroded into valleys, thus forming a caprock.

Differences in rock type also reflect on the sides of a mesa, as instead of smooth slopes, the sides are broken into a staircase pattern called "cliff-and-bench topography". The more resistant layers form the cliffs, or stair steps, while the less resistant layers form gentle slopes, or benches, between the cliffs. Cliffs retreat and are eventually cut off from the main cliff, or plateau, by basal sapping. When the cliff edge does not retreat uniformly but instead is indented by headward eroding streams, a section can be cut off from the main cliff, forming a mesa.

Basal sapping occurs as water flowing around the rock layers of the mesa erodes the underlying soft shale layers, either as surface runoff from the mesa top or from groundwater moving through permeable overlying layers, which leads to slumping and flowage of the shale. As the underlying shale erodes away, it can no longer support the overlying cliff layers, which collapse and retreat. When the caprock has caved away to the point where only little remains, it is known as a butte.

Examples and locations

Australia 

 Cockburn Range, Western Australia
 Mount Conner, Northern Territory

Czech Republic 
 Děčínský Sněžník

France 
 Mont Aiguille, Auvergne-Rhône-Alpes

Germany 
 Königstein, Saxony
 Lilienstein, Saxony
 Papststein, Saxony
 Pfaffenstein, Saxony
 Quirl, Saxony

Iraq 
Amadiya, Kurdistan Region

Ireland 
 Kings Mountain, County Sligo
 Knocknarea, County Sligo
 Knocknashee, County Sligo

Israel 
 Masada, Southern District
 Har Qatum

Italy 
 Monte Santo, Sardinia

United Kingdom

England 

 Castle Folds, Cumbria
 Cross Fell, Cumbria
 Goldsborough Carr, County Durham
 Ingleborough, North Yorkshire
 Pen-y-ghent, North Yorkshire
 Shacklesborough, County Durham

Scotland 
 Healabhal Mhòr, Isle of Skye

United States

Arizona 
 Anderson Mesa
 Black Mesa
 Black Mesa
 Black Mesa
 Black Mountain
 Cummings Mesa
 First Mesa
 Horseshoe Mesa
 Indian Mesa
 Second Mesa

California 
 Redonda Mesa

Colorado 

 Battlement Mesa
 Grand Mesa - largest flat-topped mountain in the world.
 Green Mountain
 Log Hill Mesa
 North Table Mountain
 Raton Mesa

Nevada 
 Mormon Mesa
 Pahute Mesa

Oklahoma 
 Black Mesa
 Mesa de Maya

Texas 
 Floating Mesa

Utah 
 Checkerboard Mesa
 Crazy Quilt Mesa
 Hurricane Mesa
 Sams Mesa
 Smith Mesa
 South Caineville Mesa
 Thompson Mesa
 Wildcat Mesa 
 Wingate Mesa

Wisconsin 
 Grandad Bluff

On Mars 

A transitional zone on Mars, known as fretted terrain, lies between highly cratered highlands and less cratered lowlands. The younger lowland exhibits steep walled mesas and knobs. The mesa and knobs are separated by flat lying lowlands. They are thought to form from ice-facilitated mass wasting processes from ground or atmospheric sources. The mesas and knobs decrease in size with increasing distance from the highland escarpment.

See also 

 
  
 
 
 
 
  – Group of mountains immediately south of Thunder Bay, Ontario, Canada
  – Chinese city named after a local mesa

References 

 
Erosion landforms
Geography terminology
Slope landforms